Exodus is a 2020 Iranian drama film written and directed by Ebrahim Hatamikia. Exodus narrates the story of Rahmat Bakhshi, a war veteran and his fellow hard-working cotton farmers that lose all their crops after their farms are inadvertently inundated with salt water from a local dam. In response, they drive their tractors to the Presidential Administration in protest.

Exodus screened for the first time at the 38th Fajr Film Festival, and has created controversy. The film opened on 12 April 2020.

Plot

Cast
 Faramarz Gharibian as Rahmat
 Pantea Panahiha as Mehr Banoo
 Sam Gharibian as Rahman
 Kambiz Dirbaz as Security Agent
 Mehdi Faghih as Molla Agha
 Reza Noori as Police

Production 
Ebrahim Hatamikia after making of The Report of a Party (2011), had had an idea to product a film about people's protest against the rulers but didn't reach to an appropriate story until January 2019. At the late 2018, he heard about a real protestical event which occurred on a small town. Hatamikia liked the story, so began screenwriting of Exodus at early 2019. Shoting of Exodus begun from a village of Gachsaran County and ended at Qom.

Music 

Music of Exodus composed by Karen Homayounfar. Homayounfar formerly had collaborated with Hatamikia in The Green Ring (2007–2008), The Report of a Party (2011), Bodyguard (2016) and Damascus Time (2018).

Release 

Exodus was scheduled to be screened from March 2020 onwards, but this was changed due to the outbreak of the COVID-19 pandemic, and the film was instead released online. It is the first feature film in Iran which has had its public premiere on a video on demand distribution system. Furthermore, it has been named as the first film in the Islamic Republic of Iran to be screened at a drive-in theater.

Reception

Critical response 
According to media reports, Hatamikia's technical ambitions after Che (2014), Bodyguard (2016) and Damascus Time (2018) continues here. Tehran Times newspaper described Exodus as a road movie, reminding the audience of the Classical Western films. It also describes wide shots of the cotton and corn farms, and close-ups of the main character with his believable makeup as "eye-catching". Faramarz Gharibian portrays Rahmat gracefully, making the audience believe the character's miserable life, which fuels his deep anger, is only visible in his eyes. According to a review, everything appears to be fine with the film, but the problem starts when Hatamikia tries to turn the film into a tribune for expressing his political views; it seems that the film is criticising the current Iranian government. Kayhan newspaper noted that the movie has a "reasonable, calm and firm" protest, contrasting against the Joker'''s "revolt theory".

Parviz Jahed, a notable Iranian critic, wrote that Exodus has signs of road movies such as The Straight Story (David Lynch, 1999) and The Sugarland Express (Steven Spielberg, 1974), Western movies such as Unforgiven (Clint Eastwood, 1992) and Peasant movies such as Viva Zapata! (Elia Kazan, 1952) and The Grapes of Wrath (John Ford, 1940) but that it does not belong to a particular genre; what comes to mind is a similarity to former Soviet Union patriotic and Socialist realism movies.

 Controversy 
Iranian Moderates accused Hatamikia of trying to please the country's hard-liners, pointing out that the film was financed by Owj Arts and Media Organization, which is tied to the Islamic Revolutionary Guard Corps. During a press conference, Hatamikia denied that he has ever made films on request, or ever will. The film was lambasted by Reformists immediately, who described it as a propaganda film commissioned by the radicals to undermine Hassan Rouhani. The government-run Iran'' newspaper described the film as "superficial" and "laughable". Reformist Entekhab news site said Hatamikia's talents as a filmmaker were diminishing, and the only way he could get funding was by directly hitting the President.

Awards

References

Further reading

External links 

 
 
 

2020 films
Films about farmers
Films directed by Ebrahim Hatamikia
Iranian drama films
2020s Persian-language films